Jeff Goode is an American television writer and playwright, perhaps best known as the creator of Disney Channel's American Dragon: Jake Long
and the author of the stage play The Eight: Reindeer Monologues.
Goode has written a number of pilots for television, including MTV's Undressed.

In 2006, he was named Broadway Play Publishing Inc.'s Playwright of the Year. B P P I has published his plays Dracula Rides Again, Larry and the Werewolf, Love Loves A Pornographer and Marley's Ghost.

In 2007, he received the Los Angeles Drama Critics Circle Award and the Back Stage Garland Award for his play Love Loves a Pornographer.

He is a founding member of the original No Shame Theatre in Iowa City.

Selected works

Plays 

The Elf (1987)
Dead Panther Cabaret (1989)
Waiting On Godot (1990)
Escape From Eldorado (1990)
Dead Poets (1990)
Rumpelstiltskin (1990)
Who Killed Cock Robin (1991)
Narcissus & Echo (1992)
UBU: a play for children (1994)
Ring Cycle! the Musical (1994)
THE EIGHT: Reindeer Monologues (1994)
Ubu Two: Ubu in America (1995)
Elephans (1995)
Larry and the Werewolf (1995)
Dracula Rides Again (1995)
Portrait of the Virgin Mary Feeding the Dinosaurs (1996)
Lesbian's Last Pizza (1996)
Princess Gray and the Black & White Knights (1996)
In Real Life (1996)
Ubu Three: Where's Ubu? (1997)
The Death of Dick Piston (1998)

Poona the Fuckdog and other plays for children (1999)
Prague-nosis! (2001)
The UnXmas Story (2001)
Anger Box (2003)
Don Quixote and the Black Knight (2003)
Marley's Ghost (2003)
Romeo & Julius [Caesar] (2004)
Jolly Jack Junior: the Buccaneer's Bairn (2005)
Your Swash Is Unbuckled (2007)
Ham/thello (2007)
Murder By Midnight (2007)
Love Loves a Pornographer (2007)
Seven Santas (2007)
Lear's Labour's Lost (2008)
Cosmetic Perjury (2008)
Savin' Up for Saturday Night (2009)
Yes, Svetlana, There is a Grandfather Frost (2009)
Prosthesis: Murder! (2010)
The Emancipation of Alabaster McGill (2011)
Æsopera (2012)

Television 

Undressed (1999)
Fast Food Films (1999)

American Dragon: Jake Long (2005)
Duck Dodgers (2005)
Lalaloopsy (TV series) (2013)
Tumble Leaf (2014)
We're Lalaloopsy (2017)
Molly of Denali (2020)
Arthur (2021) Episode: The Pea and the Princess
Thomas and Friends: All Engines Go! (2021)

References

External links
Jeff Goode Official Site
Jeff Goode, Broadway Play Publishing Inc Playwright of the Year 2006

American dramatists and playwrights
American musical theatre librettists
Showrunners
Living people
Place of birth missing (living people)
Year of birth missing (living people)
Disney Television Animation people